Rhinella chavin is a species of toads from family Bufonidae. It is endemic to the Huánuco Region, Peru. It is listed as an endangered species due to a restricted range and threats from habitat loss and water pollution.

References

chavin
Amphibians described in 2001
Amphibians of Peru
Endemic fauna of Peru